WBS Television known as Wavah Broadcasting Service is a Ugandan based television station owned by city billionaire Gordon Wavamunno. On December 14, 2016, it ceased to operate as a public broadcaster after it was put under receivership over Shs7.2b tax arrears by URA.

It was launched in 1999, as one of the first private non pay analog TV station in East Africa and Central Africa.

In 2004, the TV had started broadcasting the  Uganda's Parliamentary sessions live.

From 2006, it could also be watched on internet. The TV also started promoting local football through adverts about the then Uganda Super League. In 2007 the TV started airing the Soap Opera Women Series. 

In 2016,  URA appointed two lawyers to help Wavamunno to manage and run it as the company paid the rears. NBS Television boss Kin Kariisa bought the former home of WBS TV  stationed in Nagulu Hill. In 2020, the company advertised to recruit staff after four years of closure.

References

Television stations in Uganda
1997 establishments in Uganda
2016 disestablishments in Uganda